Noël Augustus Kinsella,  (born November 28, 1939) is a Canadian politician and was Speaker of the Senate of Canada from 2006 to 2014.

Education
Kinsella was born in Saint John, New Brunswick. He earned a Bachelor of Arts in psychology from University College in Dublin, Ireland. He is also an alumnus of the Pontifical University of St. Thomas Aquinas Angelicum in Rome from which he earned a Ph.L. and then a Ph.D. in 1965 with a dissertation entitled Toward a theory of personality development : a study of the works of Erik H. Erikson. Furthermore, he received an S.T.L. and an S.T.D. degree from the Pontifical Lateran University in Rome. He was a Professor for 41 years at St. Thomas University and is currently a member of the Board of Governors. He also served as Chair of the Atlantic Human Rights Centre.

Career
Kinsella was appointed to the Senate of Canada on the recommendation of Prime Minister Brian Mulroney on September 12, 1990, as a Senator for New Brunswick. He sat as a member of the Progressive Conservative Party caucus until 2004 when he joined most of the Tory caucus in becoming a Conservative Senator.

Kinsella was Opposition Whip (1994–1999) and Deputy Leader of the Opposition in the Senate (1999 – October 1, 2004) when he became Leader of the Opposition in the Senate.  On February 8, 2006, he was named Speaker of the Senate by the Governor General on the advice of Prime Minister Stephen Harper. Kinsella speaks French, and uses it in parliament. He resigned as Speaker on November 26, 2014, in anticipation of his mandatory retirement from the Senate, upon reaching the age of 75, two days later.

Kinsella is considered a Red Tory and supported Peter MacKay in his bid to become leader of the Progressive Conservative Party in 2003.

Honours and awards
Kinsella is an honorary Captain of the Royal Canadian Navy since December 2008.

He is also a knight of the Sovereign Military Order of Malta.

He was sworn in as a Member of the Queen's Privy Council for Canada on February 23, 2015. This gives him the right to the honorific prefix "The Honourable" and the post-nominal letters "PC" for life.

Honorary degrees
Honorary degrees

References

External links

The Honourable Noël A. Kinsella, The Speaker of the Senate, Biography

|-

1939 births
Alumni of University College Dublin
Canadian people of Irish descent
Canadian senators from New Brunswick
Members of the King's Privy Council for Canada
Conservative Party of Canada senators
Knights of Malta
Living people
Politicians from Saint John, New Brunswick
Pontifical Lateran University alumni
Pontifical University of Saint Thomas Aquinas alumni
Progressive Conservative Party of Canada senators
Speakers of the Senate of Canada
21st-century Canadian politicians